Pieter Hugo Naudé, also known as Hugo Naudé, (1869–1941) was a South African painter.

References

1869 births
1941 deaths
19th-century South African painters
South African male painters
19th-century male artists
20th-century South African painters
20th-century male artists